Corynexochina is a poorly understood subdivision of the trilobite order Corynexochida.

References

 
Corynexochida
Prehistoric animal suborders
Arthropod suborders